Kawki may refer to any of the following villages in Poland:
 Kawki, Kuyavian-Pomeranian Voivodeship, in north-central Poland
 Kawki, Lubusz Voivodeship, west Poland
 Kawki, Silesian Voivodeship, south Poland
 Kawki, Warmian-Masurian Voivodeship, north Poland
Kawki is also an historic, and incorrect alternative name for the Jaqaru language.